Dobo may refer to:

 Dobo, a brand name of the drug aminophylline 
 , the main city in the Aru Islands Regency
 Dobo Airport, in Dobo, Indonesia
 Dobo, The Gambia
 Dobo Forest Park, in The Gambia
 Yann Dobo (born 1978), French professional football player

See also
 Dobó, a surname of Hungarian origin
 Dobos (surname)
 Dobos torte, a Hungarian sponge cake